Kamar Ab (also Romanized as Kamar Āb) is a village in Deh Chal Rural District, in the Central District of Khondab County, Markazi Province, Iran. At the 2006 census, its population was 223, in 47 families.

References 

Populated places in Khondab County